Proper artery may refer to:

 Hepatic artery proper
 Proper palmar digital arteries
 Proper plantar digital arteries